Charles or Karl Mannay (13 October 1745 - 5 December 1824) was French Roman Catholic theologian and bishop of Trier.

Biography
He was born in Champeix, Auvergne; and studied at the Seminary of St. Sulpice, Paris. He fled France during the French Revolution, living in England and Scotland, only to return in 1801 as bishop of Trier. In 1809, under Napoleon and while the Pope was held in France, he led an ecclesiastical council in Paris, helping pressure Pius VII to agree with the Concordat of Fontainebleau in 1811. Napoleon named him baron and as a councillor. In 1820, he was named bishop of Rennes.

References

1745 births
1824 deaths
French bishops